TEXUS is a European/German sounding rocket programme, serving the microgravity programmes of ESA and DLR. The launches are conducted from Esrange in Sweden.

The first mission was conducted on 13 December 1977, using a British Skylark rocket. All missions up to TEXUS-41 in 2004 were conducted using Skylark rockets. Following the Skylark's retirement in 2005, TEXUS launches switched to the Brazilian VSB-30 rocket.

Texus Missions

MiniTexus Missions

See also
Maxus
Maser
Rexus
Esrange

References

Astronautix - Skylark
Astronautix - VSB-30

Sounding rockets
Suborbital spaceflight
Space programme of Germany